The 1966 NCAA Indoor Track and Field Championships were contested March 11−12, 1966 at the Cobo Arena in Detroit, Michigan at the second annual NCAA-sanctioned track meet to determine the individual and team national champions of men's collegiate University Division indoor track and field events in the United States.

Kansas topped the team standings, finishing one point ahead of USC. It was the Jayhawks' first title in program history.

Qualification
Unlike other NCAA-sponsored sports, there were not separate University Division and College Division championships for indoor track and field until 1985. As such, all athletes and teams from University and College Division programs were eligible to compete.

Team standings 
 Note: Top 10 only

References

Ncaa Indoor Track And Field Championships
Ncaa Indoor Track And Field Championships
NCAA Indoor Track and Field Championships
NCAA Indoor Track and Field Championships